Blevins High School is a secondary school in Blevins, Arkansas, United States. The school is the only secondary school serving grades 7 through 12. It is one of four high schools in Hempstead County and is the sole high school in the Blevins School District and Blevins, Arkansas.

Curriculum 
The assumed course of study follows the Smart Core curriculum developed by the Arkansas Department of Education (ADE), which requires students to complete at least 22 units to graduate. Students complete regular courses and exams and may self-select Advanced Placement (AP) coursework and exams with the opportunity for college credit. The school is accredited by the ADE.

Athletics 
The Blevins High School mascot is the Hornet with red and white serving as its school colors.

For 2012-14, the Blevins Hornets compete in the 2A Region 7 East Conference under the administration of the Arkansas Activities Association (AAA). Interscholastic activities include basketball (boys/girls), golf (boys/girls), baseball, softball, and track (boys/girls).

References

External links 
 

Public high schools in Arkansas
Schools in Hempstead County, Arkansas